Symbiotaphrina is a genus including seven species of fungi in the family Symbiotaphrinaceae.

Taxonomy

Sexual states of Symbiotaphrina species (formerly included in the discomycete genus Tromeropsis) are black disk-shaped apothecia with multi-spored asci, and one-celled, unpigmented ascospores.  The apothecia can revived for several years after they have been  dry.

The asexual states of Symbiotraphrina species are yeast-like endosymbionts of Anobiid beetles (e.g. the cigarette beetle Lasioderma and the related Stegobium). The ellipsoidal yeast cells have monopolar budding. A few species also have mycelial asexual states with conidium-producing pores ("phialides") in somatic hyphae.

Ecology and physiology

Symbiotaphrina species can be found on dry, decayed wood. A few live in Anobiid beetles in a specialized structure (a "mycetome") between the fore- and mid-gut. Cells are transmitted between host generations when adults rub them onto egg surfaces eaten by hatched larvae. These fungi assist beetles with B-vitamin biosynthesis, fatty acid and sterol metabolism, and break down flavonoids and other toxins.

Species
Symbiotaphrina buchneri 
Symbiotaphrina desertorum 
Symbiotaphrina kochii 
Symbiotaphrina larreae 
Symbiotaphrina lignicola 
Symbiotaphrina microtheca 
Symbiotaphrina sanguinea

References

Ascomycota
Ascomycota genera
Taxa described in 1980